Athletes from the Islamic Republic of Iran competed at the 1996 Summer Olympics in Atlanta, USA. This was for the first time after the Islamic Revolution of 1979 that Iran had a female athlete in its team.

Competitors

Medal summary

Medal table

Medalists

Results by event

Aquatics

Swimming 

Men

Athletics 

Men

Boxing 

Men

Judo 

Men

Shooting 

Women

Wrestling 

Men's freestyle

Men's Greco-Roman

References

External links
International Olympic Committee Web Site

Nations at the 1996 Summer Olympics
1996 Summer Olympics
Olympics